Gregg Cash (born September 6, 1985) is a Philadelphia born, Los Angeles based bass guitarist & Music Director best known as a current member of the hard rock band Josh Todd and the Conflict alongside Buckcherry founder Josh Todd and Buckcherry guitarist Stevie D. The band's debut album Year Of The Tiger was released September 2017. Cash is also known for his work as the former bassist in Dorothy on Jay Z's Roc Nation record label. Dorothy was ranked #14 on RollingStone Magazine's 50 best new bands in 2014. Cash is currently a sponsored player by Orange Amps.

Equipment

Cash is known for his aggressive playing and low hanging bass.

Bass guitars
Vintage Fender Precision Bass
Fender Precision Bass
Fender Jazz Bass
Vintage JB Player
Guild Starfire bass
Wild Custom Guitars Press TV-Bass
The Jit Bag (signature)

Amplifiers
Orange OB1-500 (Bass Head)
Orange OBC410 (bass cabinets)

Effects
 Tech 21 SansAmp Bass Driver DI
One Pot- Ca$h Hyper Fuzz (Signature pedal) 
 MXR M89 Bass Overdrive

References

Living people
1985 births
21st-century American bass guitarists